"How You Remind Me" is a song by Canadian rock band Nickelback. Written by lead singer Chad Kroeger and composed by the band, the track was released on July 17, 2001, as the lead single from their third studio album, Silver Side Up (2001). A "Gold Mix" was made for latter editions of the single with the heavier guitars edited out of the chorus. Kroeger referred to this song as the song that put Nickelback on the map when played at their concert in Sturgis, South Dakota.

Considered to be Nickelback's signature song, "How You Remind Me" reached the top of the US Billboard Hot 100 and was named the number-one most played song on US radio of the 2000s decade by Nielsen Soundscan, being spun over 1.2 million times on US airwaves since its release in 2001 to the end of 2009. The song was ranked fourth on the Billboard Hot 100 Songs of the Decade and 75th on the UK decade-end chart. It was nominated for the Kerrang! Award for Best Single. "How You Remind Me" was also rated the number-one rock song and number-four alternative song of the decade of the 2000s by Billboard.

The song was featured in the music video game Guitar Hero: Warriors of Rock and in a recut, PG-13 version of Deadpool 2 titled Once Upon a Deadpool. The song played a large role in a Saturday Night Live skit on March 10, 2018, with Sterling K. Brown in which the lyrics are a dying woman's final words.

Background
Lead singer Chad Kroeger had the first four lines of the song written in his black book of notes. One day he got into an argument with his then-girlfriend in their Vancouver apartment. He went to the basement, turned on his recording microphone, and started improvising and singing the song loudly, hoping she would get the message how upset he was. Instead, she told him it sounded great. "Somewhere between 45 minutes and an hour, I had the whole thing fleshed out: lyrics, melody, chords, the whole nine yards," he said.

He added, "It wasn't supposed to be a vengeful anthem; it was supposed to be what it was. I think it always felt like that in the moment, because we just had an argument, and I felt like striking back. But I find it to be a sarcastic look at relationships. [Like the line] 'Are we having fun yet?' That's full sarcasm."

Kroeger brought a skeleton version of the song to his band as a last-minute addition a week before they were to start recording Silver Side Up, and they worked on the song together.

Chart performances and awards
"How You Remind Me" peaked at number one on the US Billboard Hot 100, becoming Nickelback's only American chart-topper. Due to its high sales and massive airplay, "How You Remind Me" was ranked as the top single of 2002 by Billboard magazine. The single was certified quadruple platinum by the Recording Industry Association of America (RIAA) in 2022, for sales and streams of over 4,000,000 units. The song went on to rack up four Billboard Music Awards, four Juno Awards. "How You Remind Me" was the number one Most Played Song of 2002 in the United States, across all formats, according to Billboard Monitor. In 2003, the song was nominated for Grammy Award for Record of the Year. "How You Remind Me" was the number one song on the Billboards 2002 Year-End Hot 100 Singles Chart, and VH1 ranked the song as the 16th Greatest Power Ballad.

The song was listed at number 36 on Billboard's All Time Top 100. The song also hit number one on the Kerrang! feature, 21st Century's Official 100 Rock Best Sellers. The song was the 75th best-selling single of the 2000s in the United Kingdom. In Germany, it's not just the band's best-charting single by reaching number 3 on the German Singles Chart, it's also Nickelback's longest-staying single on that chart, namely a total of 30 weeks. In 2011, Fuse TV named it the number one song of the decade. It was listed as number 9 at the Billboard Hot 100 top 100 Rock Songs of the last 50 years. Loudwire listed the song as number 30 on its list "Top 21st Century Hard Rock Songs".

Music video
The music video for "How You Remind Me" was directed by Greg and Colin Strause and features Nickelback playing a small venue with focus on a female audience member. Kroeger admitted to disliking the idea of a small venue performance at first, opting for a bigger scale arena concert; however, he found the outcome of the video satisfying.

In the video, in scenes that alternate with the concert setting, Kroeger plays a man who is haunted by the memory of his ex-girlfriend (played by model Annie Henley). He constantly imagines or perceives her presence, making the world around him seem vibrant; when he realizes she is not there, the lighting changes to a blue-gray filter.  At the end, she attends the concert, where Kroeger's character is also in the crowd.  She approaches him but he rejects her; he is depicted physically pushing her away in the memory setting, as well as aggressively singing the song's lyrics at her in the concert setting. She is left alone in the dully lit setting.

Another version of the video exists, and has been played on some UK and Australian music channels. The video simply features the footage of the band playing from the main video, added to footage of the band's live performances and tour movies.

Track listingsUS maxi-CD single "How You Remind Me"
 "Leader of Men" (acoustic)UK CD single "How You Remind Me" — 3:43
 "How You Remind Me" (acoustic) — 3:28
 "Learn the Hard Way" — 2:54
 "How You Remind Me" (video)European CD single "How You Remind Me" (album version) — 3:43
 "How You Remind Me" (Gold Mix) — 3:43European maxi-CD single "How You Remind Me" (Gold Mix) — 3:43
 "How You Remind Me" (album version) — 3:43
 "How You Remind Me" (acoustic version) — 3:28
 "How You Remind Me" (video)Australian CD single "How You Remind Me"
 "How You Remind Me" (acoustic)
 "Little Friend"

Credits and personnel
Credits are taken from the Silver Side Up booklet.Studios Recorded at Greenhouse Studios (Burnaby, British Columbia)
 Mixed at Armoury Studios (Vancouver, British Columbia)
 Mastered at Sterling Sound (New York City)Personnel Nickelback – music, production
 Chad Kroeger – lyrics, lead vocals, guitars
 Ryan Peake – guitars, vocals
 Mike Kroeger – bass
 Ryan "Nik" Vikedal – drums
 Rick Parashar – production
 Joey Moi – engineering, digital editing
 Pat "Sajak" Sharman – assistant engineering
 Alex Aligizakis – assistant engineering, Pro Tools
 Geoff Ott – assistant engineering
 Kevin "Chief" Zaruk – production cooradination
 Randy Staub – mixing
 George Marino – mastering

Charts

Weekly charts

Year-end charts

Decade-end charts

All-time charts

Certifications

Release history

Avril Lavigne version

Canadian singer-songwriter Avril Lavigne recorded a version of "How You Remind Me" for the anime film One Piece Film: Z. It was reported on October 17, 2012, that Lavigne would be contributing two cover songs to the film: the latter track and a cover of Joan Jett's "Bad Reputation". Lavigne later confirmed the new recording on November 5, 2012. It was released on December 12, 2012, as a digital download from the One Piece Film: Z Original Soundtrack. The 2-track promotional CD single was released on the next day, exclusive to Japan.

The song was re-released on December 19, 2013, by iTunes Stores as a digital download promotional single for her self-titled fifth album. Later, it was included in the Japan, Taiwan and China Tour Edition of the album as one of the bonus tracks.

Background
Lavigne was in the studio with Kroeger working on her fifth studio album when she was asked to contribute a song to the film, but didn't have time to write another song during the studio sessions they had left. Kroeger later explained that it was Lavigne's idea to cover the song, stating:
"Avril jokingly suggested to cover a Nickelback song, but then we both figured it'd actually be a good idea to do "How You Remind Me". We recorded a version more similar to the original, but we both were not happy with it, thinking it needs its own spin. Avril then rearranged the song and we all liked it."

An audio-only video was put on Lavigne's official Vevo on January 8, 2013.

Track listingsCD single "How You Remind Me" – 4:05
 "Bad Reputation" – 2:42Digital download'
 "How You Remind Me" – 4:05

Release history

References

2000s ballads
2001 singles
2001 songs
2002 singles
Avril Lavigne songs
Billboard Hot 100 number-one singles
Epic Records singles
Irish Singles Chart number-one singles
Juno Award for Single of the Year singles
Nickelback songs
Number-one singles in Austria
Number-one singles in Denmark
Roadrunner Records singles
Rock ballads
Song recordings produced by Rick Parashar
Songs written by Chad Kroeger
Songs written by Mike Kroeger
Songs written by Ryan Peake
Sony Music Entertainment Japan singles
Torch songs